Hell on Earth is the second studio album by extreme metal band Toxic Holocaust. Along with Evil Never Dies it was reissued in 2010 to general critical approval.]

the cover art was designed by Edward J. Repka, the same designer of Leprosy's cover by Death.

Track listing
All songs written by Joel Grind.

Personnel
Toxic Holocaust
Joel Grind - vocals, guitars, bass, drums
Additional musician
Bobby Steele - guitar solo on "Hell on Earth"
Production
Ed Repka - artwork

References

2005 albums
Toxic Holocaust albums
Albums with cover art by Ed Repka